Gripen Trollhättan BK is a bandy club in Trollhättan, Sweden, formed in 1936. The club was named Gripens BK 1936–1988. The men's team played in the Swedish first division the seasons 1973–74, 2001–02, 2002–03 and 2004–05. The 2006–07 season, the club managed to reach the first division again, where the club plays the 2007–08 season. Their home arena is Slättbergshallen, where one match, Sweden–Finland, during the 2013 Bandy World Championship was played.

References

External links
 Official website

Bandy clubs in Sweden
Bandy clubs established in 1936
1936 establishments in Sweden
Sport in Trollhättan